The 1925 Atlantic hurricane season was a below-average Atlantic hurricane season during which four tropical cyclones formed. Only one of them was a hurricane. The first storm developed on August 18, and the last dissipated on December 1. The season began at a late date, more than two months after the season began. The official start of the season is generally considered to be June 1 with the end being October 31; however, the final storm of the season formed nearly a month after the official end. Due to increased activity over the following decades, the official end of the hurricane season was shifted to November 30.

The final two storms of the season impacted several areas, with the final storm affecting areas from Cuba to Rhode Island. The third storm caused little or no damage along the Texas coastline with gale-force winds being recorded only along the coast. The last storm caused severe damage along the beaches of the Florida Peninsula, with damages estimated in the millions along with four fatalities near Tampa. At least $600,000 was lost in damages dealt to the citrus industry and several maritime incidents resulted in over 55 fatalities.

The season's activity was reflected with an accumulated cyclone energy (ACE) rating of 7, one of the lowest totals ever and far below the 1921–1930 average of 76.6. ACE is a metric used to express the energy used by a tropical cyclone during its lifetime. Therefore, a storm with a longer duration will have high values of ACE. Thus, tropical depressions are not included here.


Timeline

Systems

Hurricane One 

The first indications of a tropical cyclone developing were on August 17. Roughly 18 hours later, the depression strengthened into a tropical storm, the first of the season while located to the north-northeast of the Bahamas. Gradual intensification took place throughout most of the storm's life as it traveled towards the northeast until becoming a hurricane around 0600 UTC on August 20. Increasing in forward motion, the storm became extratropical early on August 21 after turning towards the north.

Tropical Storm Two 

The second storm of the season was first identified on August 25 to the east of Florida as a tropical depression. Traveling towards the northeast, the storm gradually intensified, attainting tropical storm status around 0600 UTC the next day. Several hours later, a ship recorded a pressure of 1010 mbar (hPa) while located in the vicinity of the system. The storm turned towards the west-northwest later that day and forward motion began to increase.

Early on August 27, the storm weakened below tropical storm status and transitioned into an extratropical cyclone while moving over cooler waters. The system dissipated shortly after over open waters. Although the storm remained over water for the duration of its existence, the outer reaches of the system brought rain and light winds to Georgia, Florida, and the Carolinas. In Jacksonville, Florida, the storm produced  of rain on August 25. Between August 26 and 27, Cape Hatteras received  of rain from the storm.

Tropical Storm Three 

The third storm of the season was first identified as tropical depression off the northwestern coast of the Yucatan Peninsula early on September 6. The system moved at a steady pace to the northwest towards the Rio Grande Valley. Shortly after forming, the depression strengthened into a tropical storm. At this time, a ship in the vicinity of the storm recorded a pressure of 1012 mbar (hPa). Around 9 pm CST (0300 UTC on September 7) that night, storm warnings were issued for areas between Brownsville and Corpus Christi, Texas. These warnings were later expanded to include the entire Texas coastline.

The storm made landfall in northern Mexico, just south of the Texas border, shortly after the warnings were extended. Around the time the storm made landfall, a pressure of 1002 mbar (hPa) was recorded in Brownsville, Texas. The storm dissipated later that day over southwestern Texas. No known damage was caused as a result of this storm and storm-force winds were only recorded over a small area on the Texas coastline. The storm produced minor rainfall over south Texas with Brownsville recording  and Corpus Christi recording 0.95 in (24.1 in).

Tropical depression 
In late September, a low-pressure area detached from a dissipating frontal system and gradually organized into a tropical system over warm sea surface temperatures in the central Atlantic. A tropical depression formed by late on September 29. However, the depression transitioned into an extratropical cyclone on October 1 as it merged with another frontal system.

Tropical Storm Four 

A tropical depression developed near the Yucatan Peninsula early on November 27. The depression drifted southeastward and gradually strengthened into a tropical storm. Early on December 1, the storm made landfall near Fort Myers, Florida, at the same intensity. The system weakened and soon became extratropical. The extratropical cyclone emerged over the eastern Atlantic several hours later and regained hurricane-force winds. The northeastward movement slowed shortly after crossing Florida. Around 2300 UTC, it made landfall between Wilmington and Cape Hatteras with winds equivalent to a minimal hurricane. Shortly after landfall, maximum sustained winds in the storm dropped below . A strong area of high pressure located over the Canadian Maritimes caused the system to turn east-southeastward. On December 5, the storm weakened further to the equivalent of a tropical depression as the system began to move towards the south. The remnants of the storm continued eastward, passing several hundred miles north of Bermuda later that day. The cyclone was reported near the Azores on December 9, before finally merging with another cyclone over the North Atlantic.

The storm caused significant property and crop damage along the Gulf Coast of Florida. Trees, power lines, and telegraph wires were uprooted or knocked down by high winds along the Suwannee River. The beaches along the Atlantic coast also sustained considerable damages from the storm. Four people were killed near Tampa in two separate incidents. The first occurred when a house collapsed on three men, pinning them to the ground. The second incident occurred after a woman ran outside her home and was struck by a tree limb. In North Carolina, heavy rains and strong winds were reported along the coast. Near record high water rises were recorded around Wilmington. Cape Hatteras was temporarily isolated from the surrounding areas as the high winds from the storm knocked down power lines throughout the area. Several buildings along the coast and numerous boats sustained considerable damage. Property loses were estimated in the millions, with $1 million in Jacksonville alone. Damages to the citrus industry were also significant, with total losses exceeding $600,000. In addition to the severe impacts on land, numerous shipping incidents resulted in several deaths. A schooner carrying seven people sunk with no survivors. A tug boat sank off the coast of Mobile, Alabama, while towing a lumber barge, the fate of the crew is unknown. A ship named the American SS Cotopaxi sank between Charleston, South Carolina and the northern coast of Cuba; all 30 crew members drowned. A ship carrying about 2,000 cases of liquor with a crew of six sank near Daytona Beach. Near Savannah, Georgia, a yacht sank, drowning 12 crew members. At least 55 deaths occurred at sea.

See also 

 List of tropical cyclones
 Atlantic hurricane season
 List of Florida hurricanes
 1900–1940 South Pacific cyclone seasons
 1900–1950 South-West Indian Ocean cyclone seasons
 1920s Australian region cyclone seasons

References

External links 

 Monthly Weather Review

 
Articles which contain graphical timelines
1925 meteorology
1925 natural disasters